Crucita Gonzalez Calabaza (December 27, 1921 – May 3, 1999), also known as Blue Corn, was a Native American artist and potter from San Ildefonso Pueblo, New Mexico, in the United States. She became famous for reviving San Ildefonso polychrome wares and had a very long and productive career.

Early life
Her grandmother first introduced her to pottery making at the age of three. Maria Martinez's sister gave her the name "Blue Corn" during the naming ceremony, which is the Native American tradition of naming a child. She learned the black-on-black pottery tradition from Martinez.

Blue Corn attended school at the pueblo in her early years. She then went to Santa Fe Indian School, which was 24 miles (39 km) from home. While attending school in Santa Fe, her mother and father died, and she was sent to live with relatives in southern California where she worked as a maid for a short time in Beverly Hills.

At the age of 20, she married Santiago "Sandy" Calabaza, a silversmith from Santo Domingo Pueblo.  Together they settled at San Ildefonso, where she bore and raised 10 children. During World War II, Blue Corn worked as a housecleaner in Los Alamos for the physicist, J. Robert Oppenheimer.

Career
After her first son, Joseph, was born, she returned to pottery making. Santiago quit his job to help her carve, paint and design her pots, and by the late 1960s she had established herself as a leader in polychrome styles. After her husband died in 1972, her son Joseph began helping her with her pots. During the 1960s and 70s, she conducted many workshops on pottery making in both the U.S. and Canada. Although Blue Corn also made redware and blackware, she is especially noted for her finely polished slips and exhaustive experimentations with clays and colors, producing cream polychrome on jars and plates. She is particularly well known for her feather and cloud designs.

Blue Corn is known for the re-introduction of polychrome fine whiteware and has received critical acclaim from several publications including The Wall Street Journal. Her pottery can be found in the Smithsonian Institution and other leading museums throughout America and Europe as well as in private collections.  She won more than 60 awards including the 8th Annual New Mexico Governors Award in 1981. This is New Mexico's greatest recognition of artistic achievement.

Death
She died May 3, 1999 leaving ten children, 18 grandchildren and 12 great-grandchildren.

References

Allan Hayes and John Blom, 1996, Southwestern Pottery: Anasazi to Zuni
Peterson, Susan, 1997, Pottery by American Indian Women: The Legacy of Generations
Schaaf, Gregory, 2000, Pueblo Indian Pottery: 750 Artist Biographies

External links
Blue Corn at Holmes Museum of Anthropology
Photos of Blue Corn pottery

1921 births
1999 deaths
Native American potters
Artists from New Mexico
Year of birth uncertain
Pueblo artists
20th-century American women artists
Native American women artists
Women potters
People from San Ildefonso Pueblo, New Mexico
20th-century ceramists
American ceramists
American women ceramists
20th-century Native Americans
20th-century Native American women